Defending champion Martina Navratilova defeated Chris Evert-Lloyd in a rematch of the previous year's final, 6–4, 6–4 to win the ladies' singles tennis title at the 1979 Wimbledon Championships. It was her second Wimbledon singles title and second major singles title overall.

Seeds

  Martina Navratilova (champion)
  Chris Evert Lloyd (final)
  Evonne Goolagong Cawley (semifinals)
  Tracy Austin (semifinals)
  Virginia Wade (quarterfinals)
  Dianne Fromholtz (quarterfinals)
  Billie Jean King (quarterfinals)
  Wendy Turnbull (quarterfinals)
  Kerry Reid (fourth round)
  Virginia Ruzici (fourth round)
  Greer Stevens (fourth round)
  Sue Barker (first round)
  Regina Maršíková (third round)
  Kathy Jordan (fourth round)
  Betty Stöve (fourth round)
  Pam Shriver (second round)

Both Evonne Goolagong Cawley and Billie Jean King were given protected seedings above their actual rankings, as they were returning from almost year-long injury absences.

Qualifying

Draw

Finals

Top half

Section 1

Section 2

Section 3

Section 4

Bottom half

Section 5

Section 6

Section 7

Section 8

See also
 Evert–Navratilova rivalry

References

External links

1979 Wimbledon Championships – Women's draws and results at the International Tennis Federation

Women's Singles
Wimbledon Championship by year – Women's singles
Wimbledon Championships
Wimbledon Championships